Patina Renea Miller is an American actress and singer. Miller's breakout role was as originating the role of disco diva wannabe Deloris Van Cartier in the 2009 West End and 2011 Broadway productions of Sister Act for which she earned a Laurence Olivier Award and Tony Award nominations respectively. She also starred as the Leading Player in the 2013 Broadway revival of Pippin, for which she won the Tony Award for Best Actress in a Musical. She later returned to Broadway to star as the Witch in the 2022 Broadway revival of the Stephen Sondheim musical Into the Woods.

She is also known for her role as Commander Paylor in The Hunger Games: Mockingjay films, and her starring role as Daisy Grant in the CBS political drama Madam Secretary. She has also starred in the PBS series Mercy Street (2017). In 2021, Miller began starring as Raquel "Raq" Thomas in the Starz television drama Raising Kanan.

Early life and education
Born in Pageland, South Carolina, and raised in a single parent home, she was introduced to music at an early age and sang with the gospel choir at her local church. She attended South Carolina Governor's School for the Arts & Humanities and in 2006 graduated with a degree in musical theatre from Carnegie Mellon University. She has credited her time at Carnegie Mellon as a big part of her life, saying, "It was there that I studied and really realized that I could make my dream a reality. I'm so thankful to all my teachers who helped me to become the performer I am today."

Career
In 2005, Miller was one of three finalists for the role of Effie White in the musical drama Dreamgirls, alongside Capathia Jenkins and Jennifer Hudson (which ultimately won Hudson the Academy Award for Best Supporting Actress). In 2007, she was cast as Pam Henderson in the daytime soap opera All My Children and appeared in 30 episodes of the show. She performed in a Central Park production of Hair in the summer of 2008 and was featured in the musical Romantic Poetry at the Manhattan Theatre Club that fall.

Miller was cast as the lead role of Delores Van Cartier in Sister Act, a role she had understudied for six months during its initial run in the United States, following a year-long international search. The London production opened on June 2, 2009 at the London Palladium, and although it received mixed reviews, most critics singled out Miller and praised her performance. Benedict Nightingale of The Times cited her "terrific voice." Whoopi's wry vulnerability but adds dazzle to the razzle around her," while David Benedict of Variety thought her "powerhouse vocals, pitched somewhere between Gloria Gaynor and Whitney Houston, and her thrillingly fast vibrato act as the show's engine." For this role Miller won the whatsonstage.com Theatregoers Choice Award for Best Actress in a Musical and was also nominated for the Laurence Olivier Award for Best Actress in a Musical. She remained with the production till it closed on October 30, 2010.

Miller reprised the role of Deloris Van Cartier in the Broadway production of Sister Act, which began performances on March 24, 2011, at the Broadway Theatre and officially opened April 20, 2011. Miller also made her Broadway debut in this production. For this role she won a Theatre World Award and was also nominated for the Tony Award for Best Actress in a Musical, the Outer Critics Circle Award for Outstanding Actress in a Musical, the Drama League Award for Distinguished Performance, and the Drama Desk Award for Outstanding Actress in a Musical. She played her final performance in the Broadway company on March 18, 2012 and was replaced by Raven-Symoné on March 27. Miller also starred as Linda in the City Center Encores! production of Lost in the Stars, which ran from February 3–6, 2011.

She performed as the Leading Player in the American Repertory Theater production of Pippin from  December 5, 2012 to January 20, 2013. Miller recently reprised the role in the Broadway revival, which began performances on March 23, 2013, at the Music Box Theatre and officially opened on April 25, 2013. She won the Outer Critics Circle Award and Tony Award for Best Actress in a Musical at the 67th Tony Awards for this role.

Miller played Commander Paylor in The Hunger Games: Mockingjay – Part 1 (2014) and Part 2 in 2015. In May 2014, it was announced that she was cast as Daisy Grant, press coordinator to Secretary of State Elizabeth McCord (Téa Leoni) in the CBS political drama Madam Secretary. The show premiered on Sunday, September 21, 2014, on CBS as part of the 2014–15 television season. 

In 2019, Miller starred as the Witch in the Hollywood Bowl production of Into the Woods and reprised the role in a 2022 Broadway revival at the St. James Theatre.

Personal life
On June 14, 2014, Miller married venture capitalist David Mars in New York City. Robin Burch, Miller’s mother, who is a Baptist minister, officiated at the ceremony. Their daughter, Emerson Harper, was born on August 9, 2017 in New York City.

Discography
 Sister Act (Original London Cast Recording) (2009)
 What I Wanna Be When I Grow Up by Scott Alan, singing the song "Taking Back My Life" (2010)
 Out of Our Heads by Kooman and Dimond, singing the song "Random Black Girl" (2011)
 Pippin (New Broadway Cast Recording) (2013)

Acting credits

Film

Television

Theatre

Concerts
In 2014, she performed at Lincoln Center. The concert was broadcast on PBS as Patina Miller in Concert.

Awards and nominations

References

External links
 
 
 
 

Living people
People from Pageland, South Carolina
Actresses from South Carolina
African-American women singers
Carnegie Mellon University College of Fine Arts alumni
Tony Award winners
American television actresses
African-American actresses
American musical theatre actresses
21st-century American actresses
American film actresses
Theatre World Award winners
1984 births